Best Actress Award (Vietnamese: Giải nữ diễn viên xuất sắc nhất) is one of the awards presented at the Vietnam Film Festival to recognize an actress with the performance which has been determined the best by the juries of feature film and direct-to-video categories.

History 
The category was awarded for the first time in the 2nd Vietnam Film Festival (1973). Trà Giang, Minh Châu, Hồng Ánh and Lê Khanh are all holding the record in this category with two awards. Thu Hà was also awarded two but one of them is for the role in a direct-to-video feature film.

The achievement in a direct-to-video feature film, which was first awarded in the 9th Vietnam Film Festival (1990), is no longer awarded since the 20th Vietnam Film Festival (2017). It is because this category has been removed.

Awards

Notes 
There are also a number of times in the festival's history that a lead actress was awarded the 'Prospective Acting' award because she didn't score enough to win the 'Best Actress' award.
Thanh Quý received 'Commendable Acting' for her role in feature film Chuyến xe bão táp at the 4th Vietnam Film Festival (1977)
Ngọc Bích received the 'Prospective Acting' award for her role in feature film Cuộc chia tay không hẹn trước at the 8th Vietnam Film Festival (1988)
Hồng Ánh received 'Prospective Acting' for her role in direct-to-video feature film Cầu thang tối at the 12th Vietnam Film Festival (1999)

References 

Vietnam Film Festival
Film awards for lead actress